The vast majority of Jews in Oceania (estimation 120,000) live in Australia, with a population of about 7,000 in New Zealand (6867, according to the 2013 NZ Census). Most are Ashkenazi Jews, with many being survivors of the Holocaust arriving during and after World War II. More recently, a significant number of Jews have arrived from South Africa, Israel, the United Kingdom and Russia. The official number of people who practised Judaism in the 2001 census was only 121,459 but this number is expected to be much higher, as it did not count those overseas (i.e. dual Australian-Israeli nationals) or many non-practicing Jews who prefer not to disclose religion in the census are more common. Ironically, ever since the arrival of the First Fleet in 1788, Australia's Jewish population has hovered around 0.5% of the total counted.

The vast majority of Australia's Jews live in inner suburbs of Melbourne and Sydney with smaller populations, in numerical order, in Perth, Brisbane, the Gold Coast and Adelaide. Currently, there are also recognised communities in Ballarat, Bendigo/Castlemaine, Canberra, Geelong, Gosford, Hobart, Launceston and Newcastle.

In Melbourne, the Jewish population centre is Caulfield where there are streets with nearly a 100% Jewish population; the main areas of settlement spread out from Caulfield in two arcs: south through St Kilda, Elwood, Elsternwick, Brighton, Moorabbin and right down to Frankston; east through Toorak, Malvern, Hawthorn, Kew, Balwyn to Doncaster. In Sydney the major areas of Jewish settlement are in the east and on the North Shore, in particular the suburbs of Bondi, Dover Heights, Rose Bay, Vaucluse, St Ives and Hunters Hill.

In New Zealand, most Jews live in Auckland and Wellington with smaller populations in Dunedin and Christchurch. Dunedin synagogue has possibly the world's southernmost Jewish congregation.

The following is a list of prominent Oceanian Jews, arranged by country of origin.

Australia

Academic figures
Roy Clive Abraham, linguist
Samuel Alexander, philosopher
Neal Ashkanasy, psychologist and emotional intelligence academic
Phillip Blashki, successful businessman, magistrate, JP
Bernard Boas, marriage guidance counsellor, broadcaster, author of biblical treatises
Ron Castan, barrister and rights advocate
Sir Zelman Cowen, Governor-General (1977–1982), lawyer, university lecturer (including past appointments as Provost, Dean and Vice-Chancellor)
Linda Dessau, current Governor of Victoria, and former Family Court Judge
Marcus Einfeld, former Federal Court judge
Alan Finkel, Australia's Chief Scientist
Sir Otto Frankel, geneticist
Bryan Gaensler, astronomer and former Young Australian of the Year
Fred Hilmer, academic, lawyer and businessman
David Isaacs, architect and structural engineer, musician and composer
Phillip Isaacs, architect and structural engineer
Joseph Jacobs, historian and folklorist
Justice Stephen Kaye, judge of the Court of Appeal
William Kaye, judge of the Supreme Court 1972–1991
Kurt Mahler, mathematician
Robert Manne, academic and social critic
Sir Matthew Nathan, British soldier and judge, Governor of Queensland 1920–1925, after also serving as Governor of Sierra Leone, Gold Coast, Hong Kong and Natal; the Brisbane suburbs of Nathan and Nathan Heights are named after him, as is Nathan Street, in the Canberra suburb of Deakin
Bernhard Neumann, mathematician
Gustav Nossal, immunologist (Jewish father)
Robert Richter, barrister and human rights advocate
Hilary L. Rubinstein, historian
William D. Rubinstein, historian
Suzanne Rutland, historian
Peter Singer, philosopher
Adrienne Stone, law professor
Julius Stone, distinguished legal theorist, professor of jurisprudence and international law
James Wolfensohn, World Bank president 
Sir Albert Wolff, Chief Justice of Western Australia
Ghil'ad Zuckermann, linguist and language revivalist

Business figures

 Sir Peter Abeles, former chairman of Ansett
 Rodney Adler, CEO of HIH Insurance, convicted criminal
 Peter Alexander, fashion designer
 Albert Bensimon, Adelaide jeweller and businessman
 Harold Boas, architect, Perth councillor, Jewish community worker
 Albert Dadon, businessman 
 John Gandel and Marc Besen, founder/owners of Chadstone Shopping Centre and Sussan fashion chain
 David Gonski, public figure and businessman, philanthropist
 Joseph Gutnick, mining magnate and ex-President of Melbourne F.C.
 Poppy King, cosmetician
 Frank Lowy, co-founder of the Westfield Group, philanthropist
 Sidney Myer, founder of Myer department store and philanthropist
 Leon and Richard Pratt, founder/owners of Visy Industries
 Rene Rivkin, stockbroker and convicted insider trader
 Helena Rubenstein, cosmetician (business started in Melbourne), philanthropist, art collector 
 Sheree Rubinstein, entrepreneur
 Abe Saffron, nightclub owner, underworld figure
 Joe Saragossi, founder of G.James Glass & Aluminium, glass and window manufacturer
 John Saunders, co-founder of the Westfield Group
 Harry Seidler, architect 
 Sidney Sinclair, men's fashion label founder
 Smorgon family, founder/owners of Smorgon Steel and other businesses
 Harry Triguboff, property developer founder of Meriton

Cultural figures

 Oren Ambarchi, musician
 Jimmy Barnes, Scottish-born musician, born to a Jewish mother but raised Christian
 Eric Baume, broadcaster/journalist
 Arthur Benjamin, composer
 Danny Ben-Moshe, writer
 Rachel Berger, comedian
 John Bluthal, actor
 Lily Brett, writer
 Geraldine Brooks, Pulitzer Prize–winning writer
 Saskia Burmeister, actress
 Judy Cassab, painter
 Deborah Conway, singer-songwriter
 Ed Doolan, Australian-born British broadcaster
 George Dreyfus, composer
 Jon Faine, radio presenter
 Alex Fein, community activist, writer, and businesswoman
 Jack Feldstein, scriptwriter/neon animator
 FourPlay Electric String Quartet (3/4 Jewish)
 Louise Fox, television writer-producer
 Isla Fisher, Omani-born actress
 Tim Freedman, musician
 Amelia Frid, former child actress
 Renée Geyer, soul singer
 Henry Gilbert, actor
 Alan Gold, author
 Libby Gorr, comedian
 Yoram Gross, producer
 Michael Gudinski, record executive 
 Osher Günsberg, television/radio presenter and journalist 
 Alexander Gutman (aka Austen Tayshus), comedian 
 David Helfgott, pianist
 Elena Kats-Chernin, composer
 Danny Katz, writer/comedian
 Steve Kipner, songwriter
 Barrie Kosky, creative director
 Ben Lee, singer-songwriter
 Jack Levi (aka Elliot Goblet), comedian
 Lior Attar (aka Lior), Israeli-born singer-songwriter
 Sam Lipski, newspaper writer and editor, radio and TV broadcaster and commentator, CEO of the philanthropic Pratt Foundation
 Tziporah Malkah, actress, model
 David Malouf, writer (Jewish mother)
 Miriam Margolyes, actress
 Bill Meyer, artist
 Margaret Michaelis-Sachs, photographer 
 Isaac Nathan, Australia's first composer
 Helmut Newton, photographer
 Olivia Newton-John, singer-songwriter, actress
 Eva Orner, film-maker
 Elliot Perlman, writer
 Linda Phillips, composer
 Bram Presser, author and singer for Yidcore
 Ohad Rein, musician
 Lara Sacher, actress
 John Safran, comedian/documentarian
 Hermann Schildberger, choir leader, organist (secular and in synagogues)
 Michael Schildberger, radio and TV broadcaster and commentator
 Athol Shmith, photographer
 Michael Shmith, journalist and music critic
 Cate Shortland, screenwriter and director (Convert) 
 Larry Sitsky, composer
 Troye Sivan, actor, singer-songwriter
 Nathan Spielvogel, writer, particularly about Jewish life in early Ballarat; lay communal leader of the Ballarat synagogue
 Yael Stone, actor
 Simon Tedeschi, pianist
 Harry van der Sluys (aka Roy Rene and Mo McCackie), music hall, theatrical and radio comedian
 Felix Werder, composer
 Tal Wilkenfeld, musician 
 Yitzhak Yedid, composer
 Yidcore's members (Bram, Myki, Tim and Rory), Jewish punk band, from Melbourne, Australia
 Allan Zavod, musician

Political figures

National figures
Josh Burns, Labor member of the House of Representatives (2019–present)
 Moss Cass, former Labor cabinet minister
 Barry Cohen, Labor government minister in the Federal Parliament (1983–1987)
 Michael Danby, Labor member of the Australian House of Representatives (1998–2019)
 Mark Dreyfus QC, Attorney-General of Australia 2013–2013 Labor member of the Australian House of Representatives (2007–present)
 James Edelman, High Court Justice
 Jason Falinski, Liberal member of the Australian House of Representatives (2016–present)
 Josh Frydenberg, Liberal member of the Australian House of Representatives (2010–present), Minister for Environment and Energy 2016–2018, Deputy Leader of the Liberal Party 2018–present.
 Stirling Griff, Centre Alliance, senator for South Australia in the Upper House of Parliament (2016–present)
 Sir Isaac Isaacs, Governor General (1931–1936), prominent solicitor, member of Victorian colonial parliament, one of the drafters of the Australian constitution, member of first Australian parliament, Chief Justice of the High Court
 Julian Leeser, Liberal member of the Australian House of Representatives (2016–present)
 Mark Regev, Israeli Ambassador in Kensington, London, England (2015–2017)
 Nicola Roxon, Minister for Health and Ageing 2007–2011, Attorney-General of Australia 2011–2013 Labor member of the Australian House of Representatives (1998–2013)
 Elias Solomon, former member of Federal Parliament
 Vaiben Louis Solomon, premier of South Australia and member of the House of Representatives for South Australia

Local body politicians
 Maurice Ashkanasy, Vice-chairman of Victorian Bar Council and member of Australian Labor party
 Hajnal Ban, politician, author
 Peter Baume, Liberal cabinet minister, chancellor of the Australian National University
 Joe Berinson, Member of Federal Parliament, Minister in Whitlam's third Cabinet, State Upper house member, State Labor cabinet minister and Attorney General of Western Australia
 Ian Cohen, Greens member of the New South Wales Legislative Council (1995–2011)
 Philip Dalidakis, Labor member of the Victorian Legislative Council 
 Linda Dessau, Governor of Victoria (from 2015)
 Marcus Einfeld, human rights activist, former Federal Court judge and convicted perjurer 
 Sydney Einfeld, New South Wales Minister for Consumer Affairs (1976–1981)
 Vida Goldstein, suffragette
 Jennifer Huppert, Labor member of the Victorian Legislative Council (2009–2010)
 Martin Indyk, United States ambassador to Israel (1995–1997 and 2000–2001)
 Walter Jona, Victorian State Minister
 Dr John Kaye, Greens member of the New South Wales Legislative Council
 Sir Richard Kingsland, Public Servant, RAAF pilot who rescued two senior British WWII leaders in Morocco in 1940 
 Henry Ninio, Lord Mayor of Adelaide, co-founder of Progressive Judaism in Adelaide
 Martin Pakula, Labor member of the Victorian Legislative Council, Attorney-General 2014-Since
 Leo Port, Lord Mayor of Sydney (1975–1978)
 Julius Roe, Fair Work Australia Commissioner, former head of Australian Manufacturing Workers Union
 Eric Roozendaal, NSW Labor cabinet minister (2008–2011)
 David Southwick, Liberal Member of the Victorian Legislative Assembly
 James Wolfensohn, World Bank president
 Sir Albert Wolff, Chief Justice of Western Australia

Religious figures

 Rabbi Dr Joseph Abrahams, prominent Melbourne rabbi of the late 19th and early 20th centuries, in 1911 did not take up the call as Chief Rabbi on account of ill health
 Rabbi Dr Raymond Apple, Senior Rabbi of the Great Synagogue of Sydney, Senior Rabbi to the Australian Defence Force, Registrar of the Sydney Beth Din, author of OzTorah.com, and the leading spokesperson for Jews and Judaism in Australia from 1972 to 2005
 Rabbi Elias Blaubaum, rabbi at St Kilda Hebrew Congregation for 40 years, newspaper editor
 Rabbi Abraham Tobias Boas, rabbi in Adelaide for about 40 years
 Rabbi Rudolph (Rudie) Brasch, senior reform rabbi in Sydney for over 30 years, a well-known author and broadcaster
 Gen. Paul Cullen, founder of Emanuel Synagogue, Sydney, Army General
 Rabbi Francis Cohen, prominent Sydney rabbi in the early 20th century
 Rabbi Jacob Danglow, rabbi at St Kilda Hebrew Congregation 1905–1962, one of the most prominent rabbis in both the Jewish and the general communities
 Rev Alexander Davis, over 30 years as minister of the York Street and Great synagogues
 Rabbi Pinchus Feldman, Rabbi of the Yeshiva Centre
 Rabbi David Freedman, rabbi in Perth for over 40 years
 Rabbi Harry Freedman, rabbi in Sydney and translator for Soncino Press
Rabbi David Freilich, rabbi in Perth 1988–2012
 Rabbi Ralph Genende, rabbi at Caulfield, and prominent in interfaith dialogue
 Rabbi Lazarus Goldman, rabbi at Toorak Road synagogue, author and historian, died on the bimah in 1960 whilst conducting a Kol Nidre service in Adelaide
 Rabbi Yitzchok Dovid Groner, director of many Chabad operations in Victoria
 Rabbi J. L. Guerewitz, long serving rabbi at Carlton United synagogue
 Rabbi Chaim Gutnick, formerly rabbi of Elwood Synagogue for over forty years and life president of the Rabbinical Council of Victoria
 Rabbi Mordechai Gutnick, rabbi at Elwood and member of the Beth Din
 Rabbi Sholom Gutnick, rabbi at Caulfield for about 40 years, and Av Beth Din
 Rabbi Philip Heilbrunn, Rabbi Emeritus and long-serving rabbi at St Kilda
 Rabbi John Levi, first Australian-born rabbi, prominent Progressive rabbi, teacher and historian
 Rabbi Ronald Lubofsky, rabbi at St Kilda for over 30 years
 Joseph Marcus, a convict who trained as a rabbi and who is reputed to have conducted the first Jewish services in Sydney
 Rabbi Jerome Mark, the first Progressive rabbi in Australia
 Rev Joseph Myers, minister in Brisbane for 43 years
 Mrs Ada Phillips, founder of Australia's first permanent Progressive congregation in Melbourne
 Rabbi Israel Porush, prominent and long-serving Sydney rabbi
 Mr Abraham Rabinovitch, philanthropist and founder of Sydney's main Orthodox Jewish educational institutions
 Rev Moses Rintel, first minister of the Melbourne Hebrew Congregation, and later of the East Melbourne Hebrew Congregation
 Rabbi Louis Rubin-Zacks, rabbi in Perth for 25 years
 Rabbi Dr Herman Sanger, important Melbourne progressive rabbi, responsible for the spread of progressive Judaism to other parts of Australia
 Rabbi Max Schenk, first Progressive rabbi in Sydney, early Zionist

Sports figures

 Ben Ashkenazi, cricketer (Victorian Bushrangers)
 Ashley Brown, football (soccer) player Melbourne Victory
 Jordan Brown, Australia, midfielder (Melbourne Victory)
 David Emanuel, Australian rugby union player
 Gavin Fingleson, South African-born Australian, Olympic silver medalist
 Jessica Fox, French-born Australian, slalom canoeist, Olympic silver (K-1 slalom), world championships bronze (C-1)
 Peter Fuzes, soccer goalkeeper for Hakoah and Australia, Maccabi Hall of Fame 2003; played 1st grade 1964 till 1976; international career 1966–72, against Scotland 1967, Greece 1969, Israel 1969 and 1972; played against various European clubsides including AS ROMA 1966, Manchester United at the time of Bobby Charlton and Dennis Law
 Todd Goldstein, AFL player for the North Melbourne Kangaroos
Todd Greenberg, former CEO of the National Rugby League
 Brent Harvey, AFL games record holder and North Melbourne premiership player
 David Horwitz, rugby union fly-half / centre, New South Wales Waratahs
 Eban Hyams, India-Israel-Australia, Australian National Basketball League & Israeli Super League 6' 5" guard, first-ever Indian national to play in ULEB competitions
 Tal Karp (born 1981), female Australian football (soccer) player
 Michael Klinger, cricketer; an ex-collegian at Mount Scopus Memorial College 
 Leonard "Jock" Livingston, cricketer
 Jonathan Moss, former first-class cricketer for the Victoria cricket team (2000–07); played for Australia at the Maccabiah Games in Israel
 Phil Moss, current manager of the Central Coast Mariners in the A-League; former soccer player in the National Soccer League
 Jacob Muir, footballer, Perth Glory 
 Ray Phillips, cricketer, NSW and Queensland
 Myer Rosenblum, rugby union player and solicitor, father of Rupert Rosenblum, who notably employed John Howard as an articled clerk
 Rupert Rosenblum, rugby union player and solicitor, son of Myer Rosenblum
 Albert Rosenfeld, rugby league player
 Ian Rubin, Russian-born player for South Sydney Rabbitohs
 Geoff Selby, played for St George Dragons, tragically died in car accident in 1989. 
 Steven Solomon, Olympic sprinter; Maccabiah Games medalist
 Jordan Swibel, footballer, Western Sydney Wanderers
 Ian Synman, Australian Rules footballer with St Kilda 1958–69, notorious for playing in St Kilda's only Premiership (1966) on Yom Kippur
 Lionel Van Praag, speedway champion
 Julien Wiener, cricketer
 David Zalcberg, Australian Olympic table tennis player; also an ex-collegian at Mount Scopus Memorial College

Other figures
 Frances Barkman, schoolteacher and charitable worker
 Dunera boys, group of mainly Jewish British detainees who were deported to Australia in horrific circumstances; many of them later becoming prominent Australian citizens
 Esther Johnston, first fleet prisoner
 Solomon Levey, transported convict who later became a successful businessman
 Sir John Monash, World War I general, engineer, first chairman of Victoria's State Electricity Commission
 Lisa Jackson Pulver, first Indigenous Australian to serve as a Synagogue President 
 Ikey Solomon, First Fleet prisoner, the person on whom Charles Dickens based the character of Fagin

Fiji
Alexander Schmerrill Bowman, businessman, early settler
Sir Henry Marks, businessman, politician

French Polynesia
 Queen Marau
 Alexander Salmon
 Alexander Ariipaea Salmon

Guam
Evan Montvel Cohen, businessman
Edward D. Taussig, Governor of Guam (1899)

New Zealand

Business figures
 Sir Woolf Fisher, industrialist
 Bendix Hallenstein, clothing manufacturer and merchant, and MP
 Michael Hirschfeld, businessman, activist and Labour Party president 
 Maurice Joel, brewer and philanthropist (father of Grace Joel, qv)
 Nathaniel William Levin, businessman, father of: 
 William Levin, businessman, benefactor
 John Israel Montefiore, trader, merchant, later involved in civic affairs
 David Nathan, retailer
 Joseph Nathan, founder of GlaxoSmithKline
 Sara Tetro, entrepreneur, television personality, and model

Cultural figures
 Esmond de Beer, historian, collector, philanthropist
 Gina Bellman, actress
 Charles Brasch, poet, literature patron
 Angela D'Audney, television anchor
 Benjamin Farjeon, writer
 Willi Fels, philanthropist and collector
 Deb Filler, writer, comic actor
 Marti Friedlander, photographer
 Richard Fuchs, composer and architect
 Joseph Herscher, YouTube personality
 Grace Joel, artist
 Emma Lahana, actress
 Jeffrey Moussaieff Masson, author
 Taika Waititi, film director, writer, painter, comedian and actor

Political figures

National figures
 Frederick Baume, Member of Parliament
 Sir Francis Henry Dillon Bell, Prime Minister (1925) (Jewish mother)
 Sir Tom Eichelbaum, Chief Justice (1989–1999)
 Sir John Key (born 1961), Prime Minister (2008–2016) (Jewish mother)
 Sir Michael Myers, chief justice (1929–1946)
 Frederick Pirani, politician
 Samuel Shrimski, Member of Parliament
 Sir Julius Vogel, Prime Minister (1873–1875, 1876), newspaper founder, and science-fiction writer

Local body politicians
Mayors
 Ashburton: Hugo Friedlander (1879–1881, 1890–1892, 1898–1901)
 Auckland: Philip Philips (Auckland's first mayor, 1871–1874), Henry Isaacs (1874), Sir Arthur Myers (1905–08), Sir Ernest Davis (1935–1941), Sir Dove-Myer Robinson (1959–1965, 1968–1980), and Colin Kay (1980–1983)
 Christchurch: Charles Louisson (1888–1889, 1898–1899)
 Invercargill: Abraham Wachner (1942–1950), Eve Poole (1983–1992)
 Palmerston North: Solomon Abrahams (1887–1889)
 Wellington: Ian Lawrence (1986–1989), Mark Blumsky (1995–2001)
Other
 Dame Barbara Goodman, Auckland local body politician
 Saul Goldsmith, merchant and local body politician

Religious figures
 Rabbi Herman van Staveren (1849–1930), rabbi of the Wellington Hebrew Congregation and senior NZ rabbi, 1877–1930
 Rabbi Samuel Goldstein (1852–1935), rabbi of the Auckland Hebrew Congregation for 54 years, 1880–1934
 Rabbi Alexander Astor (1900–1988), rabbi of the Auckland Hebrew Congregation, 1934–71

Sports figures
Jo Aleh (born 1986), sailor, national champion, world champion, and Olympic champion
 Nathan Cohen, Olympic champion and world champion rower
 Josh Kronfeld, rugby player

Other figures
 Lev Aptekar, chess master
 Sir Louis Barnett, surgeon
 Ethel Benjamin, first woman lawyer in the British Empire
 Solomon Faine, microbiologist
 Erich Geiringer, lecturer and political/social campaigner
 Sir Peter Gluckman, science adviser
 Wally Hirsch, former Race Relations Conciliator
 Pei Te Hurinui Jones, Ngati Maniapoto leader and scholar (Jewish father)
 Leopold Kirschner, microbiologist
 Joel Samuel Polack, pioneer settler, author
 Phineas Selig, journalist, newspaper editor, president of the Christchurch Jewish congregation
 Mark Woolf Silverstone, socialist, local body politician, financier

Palau
Stuart Beck, diplomat

Samoa
 Taito Phillip Field, New Zealand politician born in Samoa

See also
Lists of Jews
History of the Jews in Australia
History of the Jews in New Zealand

References

External links
Jews in New Zealand in Te Ara online encyclopaedia
Jews in New Zealand in 1966 Encyclopaedia of New Zealand
Prominent Australian Jews 
New Zealand Jewish archives: Notes on Jewish Participation in New Zealand History

Lists of Jews

 
Jews,Oceanian